John Milton Mackie (19 December 1813, in Wareham, Massachusetts – 27 July 1894, in Great Barrington, Massachusetts) was a United States writer who specialized in topics from German history and literature.

Biography
He graduated from Brown University in 1832, and studied at the University of Berlin, Germany, 1833–1834. On his return to the United States, he was tutor at Brown 1835–1838. He contributed articles on German topics to the North American Review, American Whig Review, and Christian.

Books
 Life of Godfrey William von Leibnitz, with Gottschalk Eduard Guhrauer (Boston, 1845) at archive.org
 Life of Samuel Gorton in Sparks's “American Biography” series (1848)
 Cosas de España, or Going to Madrid via Barcelona (New York, 1848)
 Life of Schamyl, the Circassian Chief (1856)
 Life of Tai-Ping-Wang, Chief of the Chinese Insurrection (1857)
 From Cape Cod to Dixie and the Tropics (1864)

Notes

References
  This work in turn cites Andover Theological Seminary 1894-95 Necrology, pg. 146.
Attribution

External links
 
 

1813 births
1894 deaths
Brown University alumni
American male non-fiction writers
Humboldt University of Berlin alumni
People from Wareham, Massachusetts
Writers from Massachusetts
Historians of Germany
Brown University faculty